JBG may refer to:
 James Bond girl
 JBG Smith, an American real estate investment trust
 JBIG, an image compression format
 Jerusalem Botanical Gardens
 Juan B. Galaviz Charter School in Houston, Texas, United States
 Jung, brutal, gutaussehend, a musical album (2009)